ConoServer is a database of toxins that are expressed by the predatory sea snails in the family Conidae, the cone snails. These toxins are known as conotoxins or conopeptides. The toxins are of importance to medical research. A notable feature of these peptides is their high specificity and affinity towards human ion channels, receptors and transporters of the nervous system. This makes conopeptides an interesting resource for the physiological studies of neuroreceptors and promising drug leads.

See also
 Conidae
 Conus

References

External links
 http://www.conoserver.org

Biological databases
Protein toxins
Conidae